Paul Boudot (1571–1635) was bishop of Saint-Omer and bishop of Arras.

Life
Boudot was born in Morteau, in Franche Comté, in 1571. He graduated doctor of the Sorbonne in 1604, and was appointed the episcopal official of Jean Richardot, bishop of Arras, following him to Cambrai as archdeacon when Richardot became archbishop there. He was also appointed a preacher in ordinary to Albert VII, Archduke of Austria, preaching the funeral sermon for Albert's brother Emperor Rudolph II in the court chapel in Brussels in 1612. In 1619 he was appointed bishop of Saint-Omer, being transferred to Arras in 1626. As bishop he sat as a representative of the First Estate for the County of Artois in the Estates General of 1632. He died in Arras on 11 November 1635.

Publications
Summa theologica divi Thomae Aquinatis, recensita (Arras)
Traitté du Sacrement de Pénitence, tant en général qu'en particulier (Paris, Michel Sonnius, 1601) Available on Google Books
Harangue funèbre faicte et prononcée avec funérailles solennelles de l'empereur Rodolphe II, prononcée à Bruxelles (Arras, Robert Maudhuy, 1612) Available on Google Books
Pythagorica Marci Antonii de Dominis nova Metempsychosis (Antwerp, Gerard Wolsschaten, 1617) Available on Google Books
Formula visitationis per totam suam dioecesim faciendae (Douai, 1627)
Catechismus sive Summa doctrinae christianae pro dioecesi Atrebatensi (Douai, 1628)
Confrairie erigée en l'église et abbaye de Vicoigne de l'ordre de Premonstré (Valenciennes, Jan Vervliet, 1635) Available on Google Books

References

1571 births
1635 deaths
University of Paris alumni